Erich Cronjé (born ) is a South African rugby union player for the Italian United Rugby Championship team Zebre. His regular position is centre.

He signed for the Kings Pro14 side only for the 2019–20 Pro14. After the disbanded of the team, he signed with  until 2021 in order to play Super Rugby Unlocked and Currie Cup.

References
It's Rugby France Profile

South African rugby union players
Living people
1997 births
Rugby union centres
Southern Kings players
Blue Bulls players
Pumas (Currie Cup) players
Zebre Parma players